Lisa Vaelen (born 10 August 2004) is a Belgian artistic gymnast who represented Belgium at the 2020 Summer Olympics.

Junior career

2016-2017 
At the 2016 Belgian Championships, Vaelen swept the gold medals on every event and in the all-around in the Junior A-12 Division. She then made her international debut at the 2016 Gymnova Cup and won the gold medal in the all-around in the Espoir division.

At the 2017 WOGA Classic, Vaelen finished sixth in the all-around and placed eighth with the Belgian team. She then competed at the Belgian Championships and won the bronze medal in the all-around. Then at the 2017 Gymnova Cup, she won the silver medal in the all-around and on vault and balance beam, and she won the bronze medal on the floor exercise. Her final meet of the 2017 season was the Top Gym Tournament where she placed eighth in the all-around and on vault, and she finished fifteenth on the uneven bars.

2018 
Vaelen returned to the WOGA Classic, this time placing twelfth in the all-around. She then competed at the International GymSport and won the gold medal in the all-around. Then at the Belgian Championships, she won the bronze medal in the all-around behind Fien Enghels and Margaux Daveloose. She competed as a guest at the Dutch Championships and won the gold medal in the all-around. She then competed at the Heerenveen Friendly where the Belgian team finished second behind the Netherlands, and Vaelen placed fifth in the all-around. In August, she withdrew from the Junior European Championships due to a leg injury. She returned to competition in November at the Gymnova Cup and won the gold medal in the all-around. Her final meet of the season was the Top Gym Tournament where she won the gold medal in the all-around.

2019 
Vaelen once again began her season at the WOGA Classic, and she finished sixth in the all-around. Her next competition was the City of Jesolo Trophy where the Belgian team won the bronze medal behind Russia and the United States, and she finished nineteenth in the all-around. She then won the gold medal in the all-around at the International GymSport. At the Belgian Championships, she won the bronze medal in the all-around. She then competed at the FIT Challenge and helped Belgium win the team gold medal.

Vaelen competed at the inaugural 2019 Junior World Championships alongside Stacy Bertrandt and Noémie Louon, and they finished fifth in the team competition.

Senior career

2020-2021 
Vaelen made her senior debut at the 2020 L'International Gymnix in Montreal where she helped the Belgian team win the silver medal behind the United States. However, this was her only competition of the season due to the COVID-19 pandemic.

At the 2021 Osijek Challenge Cup, Vaelen won the bronze medal on the uneven bars behind Nina Derwael and Zsofia Kovacs. She then competed at the FIT Challenge and helped Belgium win the team silver medal behind France. She was selected to represent Belgium at the 2020 Summer Olympics alongside Nina Derwael, Maellyse Brassart, and Jutta Verkest. She competed on the vault, uneven bars, and floor exercise in the team final where the team finished eighth.

2022
In August, Vaelen competed at the European Championships in Munich, where she contributed to Belgium's fifth place finish in the team final. Individually, she placed fifth in the all-around, and finished fourth in the vault final behind Zsófia Kovács, Asia D'Amato and Aline Friess with a total score of 13.583.

Competitive history

Reference

External links

 
 
 
 
 

2004 births
Living people
Belgian female artistic gymnasts
Olympic gymnasts of Belgium
Gymnasts at the 2020 Summer Olympics
People from Bonheiden
Sportspeople from Antwerp Province
21st-century Belgian women